No One Would Tell is a 1996 American teen crime drama television film directed by Noel Nosseck from an original script by Steven Loring. It is based on the true story of 14-year-old Amy Carnevale, who was murdered by her 16-year-old boyfriend Jamie Fuller, on August 23, 1991, in Beverly, Massachusetts. A remake debuted on Lifetime on September 16, 2018.

Plot
This story takes place at North High School, where Stacy Collins is a shy 16-year-old student who has had a secret romantic interest in Bobby Tennison for two years. She is surprised when he starts to show a romantic interest in her, considering he is a senior wrestler, and the most popular guy in school. They soon start dating, and find out that their fathers had abandoned them. Stacy is upset that her mother, Laura, is dating a man named Rod who treats her very badly, and often urges her to leave him and treat herself better.

After a few weeks of dating, Bobby starts showing possessive behavior. He is jealous whenever another guy approaches or talks about Stacy, and does not want her to hang out with anyone when they are together. At first, she does not suspect that there is anything wrong, because he immediately apologizes after getting mad at her, tells her that he loves her, and gives her gifts to show his remorse.

Stacy soon promises Bobby that they will be together forever. She also agrees not to hang out with other people anymore even if he is not around. At school, boys start to notice her after her best friend, Nicki, convinces her to wear a mid-thigh length skirt for Bobby. In the boys' locker room, one of the boys gives her a compliment, which outrages him. After this, he furiously tells her she looks like a slut, demands that she wear proper clothes, and forces her to change into a pair of his track pants in the bathroom. She tries to explain that she was only dressing up for him, but he becomes more furious and throws and slams her into the wall. Back at home, Laura worries that she is spending too much time with him, but she assures her that he loves her and vice versa. Meanwhile, Nicki and her friend, Val Cho, also grow concerned about Stacy's relationship with him. Nicki soon learns from Bobby's cousin, Donna Fowler, that his last girlfriend changed schools after being hit by him. Her worry grows when she notices that Stacy has several unexplained bruises on her body. She talks to her about what she heard, but Stacy, frustrated, assures her that she can take care of herself.

By accident, Stacy meets Bobby's mother; he catches them talking to each other and becomes furious and violent. Upset, she refuses to see him again, and later takes it out on Laura, calling her irresponsible. He later wins her trust back by telling her about the alcoholism that runs in his family. His father was an abusive alcoholic and his mother would not leave him. He left on his own. They are happy for a while, but trouble begins again when he sees her talking to another boy at the school dance. He pulls her outside into the parking lot and slaps her, all of which is witnessed by Nicki and her boyfriend, Tony, who are nearby.

Nicki quickly confronts Stacy about how badly Bobby is treating her, but she defends him, saying he has been through a lot. When Nicki says that Bobby doesn't love her, she angrily says, "Then you don't know what love is!" before taking off with him in his car. After Nicki helps her see the truth, she accepts that Bobby is not treating her right and ends their relationship. When he does not take it well, she offers for them to just be friends, but they are soon estranged when he hears that she was talking to another boy at a birthday party and slaps her again despite the fact that they are no longer dating.

Later that night, Bobby, accompanied by an acquaintance named Vince Fortner, convinces Stacy to get in his car for a ride. He drives to the lake and walks off with her to be alone. The next day, it is reported that she is missing. Most people guess that she hitchhiked and was murdered, but Laura suspects that Bobby has something to do with it especially after she finds Stacy's purse in his room. Nicki is also convinced that he is responsible and asks Carla, who was at Bobby's house on the night of Stacy's disappearance, for information. She insists that all she knows is Stacy ran out of the house after arguing with Bobby, which frustrates Nicki. Accompanied by Laura, Nicki goes to the police, informing Laura and Detective Anderson about how abusive Stacy's relationship with Bobby was. Carla eventually talks to them as well, admitting that Bobby and Vince took Stacy to the lake.

Bobby and Vince are arrested and Bobby blames Stacy's disappearance on Vince. When confronted by this lie, he admits that Bobby was the one last seen with her, and later reveals that when he came back alone, he said that "if he can't have her, no one's gonna." Vince is free to go, since he told Detective Anderson the truth, that he didn't know if Bobby killed Stacy. Detective Anderson is then convinced Bobby did so when she ended their relationship and refused to get back together. When he confronts him, he realizes he is cornered and shortly admits that he slit her throat when she refused to get back together with him and then disposed of her body in the lake.

Stacy's body is soon found in the lake, wrapped in a trash bag bound with duct tape, and tied down with cinder blocks. Laura and Nicki grieve together. A court trial soon follows with the district attorney asking everyone if they ever saw Bobby hit Stacy. Carla says she did, but that it was because Stacy wouldn't listen to him. Donna and other classmates also admit that they witnessed the abuse, but figured she would leave him eventually.

Val, Vince, Nicki, and Tony expose the abusive ways that Bobby treated Stacy, with Nicki saying how she desperately wanted to oust him, but was afraid of losing Stacy's friendship if she were to say what he was doing to her. He is eventually found guilty and sentenced to life in prison without the possibility of parole. The judge tells the witnesses to tell someone next time they see a friend being abused instead of standing by and doing nothing, implying how it could have saved Stacy's life.

Later, a distraught Nicki cleans out Stacy's locker and cries as she looks at the pictures of them, remembering their friendship and guiltily wishing that she had acted sooner to have saved her. The film ends with Nicki and Tony leaving a bouquet of roses on the sand at the lake in memory of Stacy.

Cast
 Candace Cameron Bure as Stacy Collins
 Fred Savage as Robert "Bobby" Tennison
 Michelle Phillips as Laura Collins
 Gregory Alan Williams as Detective Anderson
 Heather McComb as Nicki
 Justina Machado as Val Cho
 Eric Balfour as Vince Fortner
 Rodney Eastman as Tony Dinardo
 Tiana Marie Brown as Emily Stone
 Martha Romo as Carla
 Paige Moss as Donna
 Steve Smith as Steve McGuire
 Sally Jessy Raphael as the Judge

Reception
The film received mixed reviews from critics, but Candace Cameron Bure and Heather McComb were praised for their acting performances.

Remake

The film was remade by Lifetime, with Shannen Doherty as Laura Collins, Matreya Scarrwener as Sarah Collins, and Callan Potter as Rob Tennison, and premiered on September 16, 2018.

References

External links
 

1996 television films
1996 films
1996 crime drama films
1990s teen drama films
American crime drama films
American teen drama films
Films about domestic violence
Drama films based on actual events
Films scored by Michael Tavera
Films about murderers
NBC network original films
Crime films based on actual events
American drama television films
1990s English-language films
Films directed by Noel Nosseck
1990s American films